Tercio de Vizcaínos (Third of Vizcaínos) was a unit of Spanish militia of Buenos Aires, composed in its majority by volunteers of  Basque, Castilian and Asturian origin. This infantry unit was established after the first English Invasion to the Río de la Plata.

History 

The Third of Vizcaínos was created on September 8, 1806, and was formed with a Company of militiamen from Cantabria, under the command of Prudencio Murguiondo, five companies of Vascos and Navarros, and two militia companies formed by volunteers from Asturias. The Vizcaínos also had a Cuerpo de Cazadores Correntinos, composed of sixty-seven soldiers under the Captain Juan José Blanco.

Prudencio Murguiondo and Miguel Cuyar, Captain of the 8th Compañía de Asturianos, were distinguished by the Supreme Junta of Seville on behalf of Fernando VII of Spain, for his heroic actions in the Reconquest of Buenos Aires against the English invaders.

The Tercio de Vizcaínos was dissolved in 1809, after its members took part in the Mutiny of Álzaga against the Viceroy Santiago de Liniers.

References 

Regiments of Argentina
Military history of Argentina
Río de la Plata